Enrique Martín Hermitte was an Argentine geologist who served as the first director of Servicio Geológico Minero from its founding in 1904 to 1922. He es credited with bringing to Argentina a number of talented geologists from Europe as well as supporting young Argentine geologists by employing local university students.

European geologist brought to Argentina by Hermitte include John Keidel and Walther Penck.

References

External links
 
 

1871 births
1955 deaths
Argentine geologists
People from Buenos Aires
Argentine people of French descent
University of Buenos Aires alumni
Mines Paris - PSL alumni
Academic staff of the University of Buenos Aires
Servicio Geológico Minero personnel